Aleksei Ivanovich Uversky (12 February 1886(NS)1942) was an association football player.

He was born in St Petersburg, illegitimate son of a peasant woman, Euphrosyne Petrovna Lyarskaya and adopted in 1889 by merchant Ivan Osipovich Uversky whose patronymic he took.

Uversky made his debut for Russia on July 1, 1912, in a 1912 Olympics game against Germany. 

He was also a keen boxer.

He died during World War II as a civilian during the Siege of Leningrad, reportedly in hospital from wounds received serving on the frontline.

References

External links
  Profile

1880s births
1942 deaths
Russian footballers
Russia international footballers
Footballers at the 1912 Summer Olympics
Olympic footballers of Russia
Association football midfielders
Victims of the Siege of Leningrad